Harry Brighouse is a British political philosopher at the University of Wisconsin–Madison. His research interests include the relationship between education and liberalism. His work on this topic has been widely cited by broadsheet newspapers, such as The Independent, and The Guardian.

His work has been published in The Independent, New Statesman, academic journals, and other newspapers and magazines. Brighouse has also written on justice more generally and on cosmopolitanism.

Brighouse received his B.A. from King's College London and earned his PhD in philosophy from the University of Southern California, under the direction of Barbara Herman. He is the son of Tim Brighouse, former commissioner of schools for London.

Brighouse is a member of the Crooked Timber group blog.

Honours
He was a Carnegie Scholar chosen by the Carnegie Corporation of New York in 2004 to work on a project entitled Educational Justice and Institutional Reform. He is also a Senior Adviser to the Spencer Foundation, a Chicago-based nonprofit dedicated to improving education through nonpartisan, high-quality academic research. Brighouse is also a Fellow of the Human Development and Capability Association (HDCA).

Selected bibliography

Books 

 
 
 
  Translated into Polish as

Chapter in books

Journals

Notable blog contributions

References

External links
 Harry Brighouse home page

British political philosophers
Living people
British bloggers
Alumni of King's College London
University of Wisconsin–Madison faculty
University of South Carolina alumni
Year of birth missing (living people)